Justine Henin was the defending champion, but she didn't defend her title due to her retirement after the Australian Open.

Julia Görges won the title, defeating World No. 1 Caroline Wozniacki in the final, 7–6(7–3), 6–3.

Seeds
The top four seeds received a bye into the second round.

Qualifying

Draw

Finals

Top half

Bottom half

External links
Main Draw
Qualifying Draw

Porsche Tennis Grand Prix - Singles
Porsche Tennis Grand Prix